The women's 4×100 metre freestyle relay was a swimming event held as part of the swimming at the 1936 Summer Olympics programme. It was the sixth appearance of the event, which was established in 1912. The competition was held on Wednesday and Friday, 12 and 14 August 1936.

The United States and Germany both replaced one swimmer between the semi-finals and the final. Thirty-eight swimmers from nine nations competed.

Medalists

Note: The International Olympic Committee medal database shows only these swimmers as medalists. Ursula Pollack swam for Germany in the semi-finals but is not credited with a silver medal. Also the American Elizabeth Ryan who swam in the semi-finals is not listed as bronze medalist.

Records
These were the standing world and Olympic records (in minutes) prior to the 1936 Summer Olympics.

In the final the Netherlands set a new Olympic record with 4:36.0 minutes.

Results

Semifinals

Wednesday, 12 August 1936: The fastest three in each semi-final and the fastest fourth-placed advanced to the final.

Semifinal 1

Semifinal 2

Final

Friday, 14 August 1936:

References

External links
Olympic Report
 

Swimming at the 1936 Summer Olympics
1936 in women's swimming
SWim